James "Nib" Hogg was a Scottish association football outside right who played professionally in the American Soccer League.

In 1924, Hogg signed with J&P Coats of the American Soccer League. In January 1927, J&P Coats gave Hogg an unconditional release after he played no first team games with them to that point in the season. He joined Providence F.C. soon after and remained with them until 1930.

External links

References

1903 births
People from Montrose, Angus
American Soccer League (1921–1933) players
Fall River F.C. players
J&P Coats players
Providence Clamdiggers players
Pawtucket Rangers players
Scottish footballers
Scottish expatriate footballers
Expatriate soccer players in the United States
Year of death missing
Association football forwards
Scottish expatriate sportspeople in the United States
Footballers from Angus, Scotland